Huang Bowen (born 13 July 1987) is a Chinese professional footballer who currently plays for Chinese Super League club Guangzhou F.C. He holds the record as the youngest ever goalscorer in top tier Chinese football aged 16 years and 317 days.

Club career
Huang Bowen started his football career with Beijing Guoan when he was promoted to the club's first team in the 2004 season. As a promising youngster, he made his debut for the club on 26 May 2004 in a 4-1 win against Shenyang Ginde that also saw Huang score his first goal. By the end of his debut season, he'd played in six league games. Although these were often as a substitute, he would gradually start to establish himself within the senior team. In the subsequent seasons, he continued to make substitute appearances and gradually established himself as a regular for the club. It wasn't until the 2007 season that Huang started to establish himself as an integral member of the Beijing squad, helping them finish as runners-up in the league.

On 10 February 2011, Huang transferred to K-League side Jeonbuk Hyundai Motors. He made his debut for the club on 6 March 2011 in a 1-0 loss against Chunnam Dragons. This was followed by his first goal for the club in an AFC Champions League game on 6 March 2011 in a 4-0 win against Arema FC.

On 7 July 2012, Huang transferred to Chinese Super League side Guangzhou Evergrande. He was a vital part of Guangzhou's winning run in the 2013 AFC Champions League as the club became only the second Chinese side to win a continental title. On 13 August 2017, Huang suffered a lumbar fracture during a league match against Henan Jianye when he was knocked off balance by Ricardo Vaz Tê, which ruled him out for the rest of the season.

International career
Huang made his debut for the Chinese national team on 25 May 2008 in a 2-0 win against Jordan. Despite his age and inexperience, then manager Vladimir Petrović let Huang play in a crucial 2010 FIFA World Cup qualification game with only one cap to his name in a 1-0 loss against Qatar, essentially knocking China out of qualification. While he did not take part any further in the remaining qualification games, he returned to the national team when he took part at the 2011 AFC Asian Cup qualification under caretaker Yin Tiesheng.

Career statistics

Club statistics
.

International statistics

International goals
 
Scores and results list China's goal tally first.

Honours

Club
Beijing Guoan
Chinese Super League: 2009

Jeonbuk Hyundai Motors
K-League: 2011

Guangzhou Evergrande
Chinese Super League: 2012, 2013, 2014, 2015, 2016, 2017, 2019
AFC Champions League: 2013, 2015
Chinese FA Cup: 2012, 2016
Chinese FA Super Cup: 2016, 2017, 2018

International
China PR national football team
East Asian Football Championship: 2010

Individual
Chinese Football Association Young Player of the Year: 2008
Chinese Super League Team of the Year: 2015
AFC Champions League Dream Team: 2015

Notes

References

External links

Player stats at Sohu.com

1987 births
Living people
Sportspeople from Changsha
Chinese footballers
Footballers from Hunan
China international footballers
Chinese expatriate footballers
Beijing Guoan F.C. players
Jeonbuk Hyundai Motors players
Guangzhou F.C. players
K League 1 players
Association football midfielders
Chinese expatriate sportspeople in South Korea
Expatriate footballers in South Korea
2011 AFC Asian Cup players
Chinese Super League players